The Acropolis International Tournament 2019 is a basketball tournament held in OAKA Olympic Indoor Hall in Athens, Greece, from August 16 until August 18, 2019. It was the 29th edition of the Acropolis International Basketball Tournament. The competition is played under FIBA rules as a round-robin tournament. The four participating teams were Greece, Italy, Serbia, and Turkey.

The Serbia roster went undefeated and won the tournament.

Venues

Participating teams

Standings

Results 
All times are local Central European Summer Time (UTC+2).

Final standing

Statistics 
Source

Top Scorers

Rebounds

Assists

Steals

Blocks

Foul

See also 
 2019 Italy FIBA Basketball World Cup team
 2019 Serbia FIBA Basketball World Cup team

References

External links
Hellenic Basketball Federation Official Website 
Basket.gr Acropolis Cup History Search Results 
Acropolis Cup 2019 Official Stat 
Acropolis Cup 2019 Results 

Acropolis International Basketball Tournament
Acropolis
2019–20 in Greek basketball
2019–20 in Italian basketball
2019–20 in Serbian basketball
Serbia at the 2019 FIBA Basketball World Cup
Italy at the 2019 FIBA Basketball World Cup